"Bitter Heart" is a song by British new wave duo Seona Dancing, released as a single in 1983. It is a David Bowie-style new wave pop song, sung by a then-unknown Ricky Gervais with synthesizers provided by Bill Macrae. The song peaked at No. 79 on the UK Singles Chart, and remained in the top 100 for 3 weeks.

Music video
A video was made in 1983. It has had considerable play in recent years on talk shows interviewing Gervais and has been played on "'80s flashback" shows. The plot of the video is a girl in a wedding dress who was about to get married and has just had her husband leave her, after which she becomes angry and destroys most of the objects in the room.

2012 cover version
In August 2012, British pop group Super 8 Cynics released a cover of the song through Manchester record label Longevity Records.

References

1983 songs
1983 singles
Seona Dancing songs
Songs written by Ricky Gervais
London Records singles